Thomas Heyward Tucker (9 February 1796 – 25 September 1832) was an English first-class cricketer associated with Cambridge University. He was a student at Sidney Sussex College, Cambridge, and is recorded in one match in 1822, totalling 0 runs with a highest score of 0.

References

English cricketers
English cricketers of 1787 to 1825
Cambridge University cricketers
1796 births
1832 deaths
Alumni of Sidney Sussex College, Cambridge
Cricketers from Devon